Sohag Stadium is located in the city centre of Sohag, its capacity is 20,000.

References

Football venues in Egypt
Stadiums in Egypt